Columbicola extinctus, also known as the passenger pigeon chewing louse, is an extant species of phtilopterid louse that was once believed to have been extinct with its only known host, the passenger pigeon, prior to its rediscovery living on band-tailed pigeons. Like other members of the genus Columbicola, the insect is a long, slender louse that shows marked sexual dimorphism in the antennae, as the male's are much longer than those of the female in the third segment. The thorax has two very long setae on each side. The generic name Columbicola comes from the Latin words columba, "dove," and -cola, "inhabitant," in reference to the genus's primary hosts.

Columbicola extinctus was originally described by Richard O. Malcomson in 1937. It was originally believed to have only lived on the passenger pigeon, which had been extinct for 23 years by the time of its discovery. Malcomson believed that Columbicola extinctus had become extinct with its host and gave it the specific name extinctus to mark this fact. However, by 1999 Columbicola extinctus had been rediscovered living on the band-tailed pigeon, which is one of the passenger pigeon's closest living relatives.

While the precise range of Columbicola extinctus is not known, it is only known to live on one extant host, the band-tailed pigeon, and has been found on birds across its range. The band-tailed pigeon lives along the Pacific coast of North America from southern British Columbia to northern Baja California. It is also found in the southern Rocky Mountains of Utah and Colorado south down the center of the continent through Central America and into South America. While its second known host, the extinct passenger pigeon, was alive, the louse could also be found in eastern North America from southern Canada south to the Gulf Coast and northern Florida.

Columbicola extinctus feeds on the feathers and skin debris of their host. Their elongated shape allow them to conceal themselves between feather shafts and therefore avoid dislodgement while its host is preening or in flight. They spend their entire life on a host pigeon, and can only be transferred from one pigeon to another when the pigeons come in contact. These lice lay their eggs in parts of the body inaccessible to preening, such as the interior of feather shafts. Columbicola extinctus is an exopterygote and is born as a miniature version of the adult that is known as nymph. The nymphs molt three times before reaching the final adult form, usually within a month of hatching.

References

Cited texts 
 
 

Lice
Parasites of birds
Insects of North America
Insects described in 1937